Neely Township is one of ten townships in Butler County, Missouri, USA.  As of the 2010 census, its population was 1,126.

Neely Township was organized in 1871, and named after Obadiah Neely, an early citizen.

Geography
It contains seven cemeteries: Crab, Harris Ridge, Lutz, Neeleyville, Roberts, Sheely and Sims.

The streams of Big Cane Creek, Cane Creek, Cope Branch, Fox Branch and Gaines Slough run through this township.

Transportation
Neely Township contains one airport or landing strip: Wattle Landing Strip.

References

External links
 US-Counties.com
 City-Data.com

Townships in Butler County, Missouri
Townships in Missouri